James Sinclair may refer to:

 James Sinclair (footballer) (born 1987), English footballer
 Jimmy Sinclair (1876–1913), South African cricketer
 James Sinclair (politician) (1908–1984), Canadian politician
 James Sinclair (fur trader) (1811–1856), Canadian fur trapper
 James H. Sinclair (1871–1943), U.S. Congressman from North Dakota
 James Sinclair (conductor), American classical music conductor
 James Sinclair, 12th Earl of Caithness (1766–1823), Scottish noble
 James Sinclair, 14th Earl of Caithness (1821–1881), Scottish Liberal politician, scientist and inventor
 James Sinclair (botanist) (1913–1968), Scottish botanist
 James Sinclair, 8th Lord Sinclair, Scottish nobleman
 James Sinclair, English co-founder of EnterpriseAlumni

See also
 James St Clair (1688–1762), Scottish soldier and MP
 Jim Sinclair (disambiguation)